Mykola Dibrova is a Ukrainian Paralympic athlete with cerebral palsy. He represented Ukraine at the 2016 Summer Paralympics in Rio de Janeiro, Brazil and he won the silver medal in the men's shot put F36 event.

At the 2017 World Para Athletics Championships held in London, United Kingdom, he won the bronze medal in the men's shot put F36 event. At the 2018 European Championships held in Berlin, Germany, he won the silver medal in the men's shot put F36 event.

In 2019, he competed in the men's shot put F36 event at the 2019 World Para Athletics Championships held in Dubai, United Arab Emirates.

Achievements

References

External links 
 

Living people
Year of birth missing (living people)
Place of birth missing (living people)
Ukrainian male shot putters
Athletes (track and field) at the 2016 Summer Paralympics
Medalists at the 2016 Summer Paralympics
Paralympic silver medalists for Ukraine
Paralympic medalists in athletics (track and field)
Paralympic athletes of Ukraine
Track and field athletes with cerebral palsy
21st-century Ukrainian people